Events from the year 1631 in England.

Incumbents
 Monarch – Charles I
 Lord Chancellor – Thomas Coventry, 1st Baron Coventry

Events
 5 February – Puritan minister and theologian Roger Williams emigrates to Boston in the Massachusetts Bay Colony.
 20 February – A fire breaks out in Westminster Hall, but is put out before it can cause serious destruction. 
 14 May – Mervyn Tuchet, 2nd Earl of Castlehaven, is beheaded on Tower Hill, London, and attainted for sodomy and for assisting in the rape of his wife following a leading case which admits the right of a spouse claiming to be injured to testify against her husband.
 28 May – William Claiborne sails from England to establish a trading post on Kent Island, the first English settlement in Maryland.
 December – The Holland's Leguer, a notorious brothel in Southwark (London), is ordered closed and besieged for a month before this can be carried out.
 Poor harvest for second year in a row causes widespread social unrest.
 Worshipful Company of Clockmakers established in London.
 Publication of the "Wicked Bible" by Robert Barker and Martin Lucas, the royal printers in London, an edition of the King James Version of the Bible in which a typesetting erratum leaves the seventh of the Ten Commandments with the word not omitted from the sentence "Thou shalt not commit adultery". Copies are withdrawn and about a year later the publishers are called to the Star Chamber, fined £300 and have their licence to print revoked.
 William Oughtred publishes Clavis Mathematicae, introducing the multiplication sign (×) and proportion sign.
 Thomas Hobbes is employed as a tutor by the Cavendish family, to teach the future Earl of Devonshire.

Arts and literature
 9 January – The masque Love's Triumph Through Callipolis, written by Ben Jonson with music by Nicholas Lanier and designed by Inigo Jones, is performed at Whitehall Palace.
 11 January – The Master of the Revels refuses to license Philip Massinger's new play, Believe as You List, because of its seditious content; it is first performed in a revised version on 7 May.

Births
 1 January – Katherine Philips, poet (died 1664)
 6 February – Edward Abney, politician (died 1727)
 20 February – Thomas Osborne, 1st Duke of Leeds, statesman (died 1712)
 15 April – Walter Vincent, English politician (died 1680)
 29 April – Joseph Bridger, Colonial Governor of Virginia (died 1686)
 4 May – William Brereton, 3rd Baron Brereton, politician (died 1680)
 29 May – Robert Paston, 1st Earl of Yarmouth, politician (died 1683)
 4 July – John Roettiers, engraver (died 1703)
 15 July – Richard Cumberland, philosopher (died 1718)
 7 August – Nicholas Tufton, 3rd Earl of Thanet, (died 1679)
 19 August – John Dryden, writer (died 1700)
 24 August – Philip Henry, nonconformist minister (died 1696)
 6 September – Charles Porter, Lord Chancellor of Ireland (died 1696)
 29 September – Richard Edlin, astrologer (died 1677)
 12 October – George Saunderson, 5th Viscount Castleton, politician (died 1714)
 13 October – Richard Hampden, politician (died 1695)
 18 October – Michael Wigglesworth, Puritan minister, doctor and poet in New England (died 1705)
 4 November – Mary, Princess Royal and Princess of Orange (died 1660)
 10 November – Daniel Harvey, merchant, diplomat and politician (died 1672)
 14 December – Lady Anne Finch Conway, philosopher (died 1679)
 John Barret, Presbyterian minister and religious controversialist (died 1713)
 Arthur Capell, 1st Earl of Essex, statesman, implicated in Rye House Plot (suicide 1683)
 Joan Dant, Quaker merchant and philanthropist (died 1715)
 Richard Lower, physician who performs the first direct blood transfusion (died 1691)
 John Phillips, satirist (died 1706)
 approx. date – William Ball, astronomer (died 1690)

Deaths
 1 January – Thomas Hobson, carrier and origin of the phrase "Hobson's choice" (born 1544)
 7 February – Gabriel Harvey, writer (born c. 1552)
 31 March – John Donne, poet and Dean of St Paul's (born 1572)
 6 May – Sir Robert Cotton, 1st Baronet, of Connington, politician and antiquarian (born 1571)
 25 May – Samuel Harsnett, Archbishop of York and religious writer (born 1561)
 18 June – Sir Robert Payne, politician (born 1573)
 21 June – John Smith, soldier and colonist (born 1580)
 28 October – Sir Richard Beaumont, 1st Baronet, politician (born 1574)
 23 December – Michael Drayton, poet (born 1563)

References

 
Years of the 17th century in England